Stade Henri-Jooris was a sports stadium in Lille, France. The stadium, used mostly for football matches was able to hold 15,000 people and was home stadium of Olympique Lillois and Lille OSC.

Originally it was known as Stade de l'avenue de Dunkerque; from 1907 to 1943, the stadium's name was the Stade Victor Boucquey. That year it was renamed after the former president of Olympique Lillois Henri-Jooris (who died four years before).

The stadium suffered a roof collapse during the Lens-Lille derby in February 1946. 53 spectators were injured as the structure partially collapsed during a 19th minute counterattack. The game was only delayed 20 minutes.

During the 1938 World Cup, it hosted one game.

1938 FIFA World Cup

References

Stade Henri-Jooris
Defunct football venues in France
Sports venues completed in 1902
Stade Henri-Jooris
Football venues in France
1938 FIFA World Cup stadiums
Stade Henri-Jooris
Olympique Lillois